Anne de La Roche-Guilhem or La Roche-Guilhen (July 24, 1644, Rouen – 1707 or 1710, England) was a French writer and translator.

Biography
The daughter of Charles de Guilhen and Marie-Anne d'Azemar, she was, by her mother, a grand-niece of the poet Antoine Girard de Saint-Amant.  Anne de La Roche-Guilhem became known by several works of fiction. A Protestant, she emigrated to England on the revocation of the Edict of Nantes (1685), perhaps via the Netherlands.  Her father having died without a fortune, and she herself having never abjured from Protestantism, she sought in vain for protectors by dedicating some of her works to princesses, or to Charles II.  Rare-in-All, her comedy-ballet, was composed for the king's birthday (1677).  She also translated Spanish works.  Finally, settled in London, she died there surrounded by Huguenot friends.  The circulation of her works written in England, printed in Holland, secretly distributed in France, shows how the Protestant networks worked in this troubled time.

1644 births
1710 deaths
17th-century French women writers
17th-century writers
17th-century French novelists
French Protestants
French women novelists